12 Hours (Spanish: 12 Horas) is a 2001 Puerto Rican movie. It was written and directed by Raúl Marchand Sánchez, and marked both his screenwriting and directorial debut.

The movie follows 12 hours or one night in the life of a taxi driver and other characters in Santurce, Puerto Rico.

It had a six-week run in Puerto Rican cinemas. Its profanity and sexual content were a definite deviation from the norm as far Puerto Rican films up to that time.

Cast
Patricia Alonso  as Spanish Fly (drag queen)
Jaime Bello  as Gustavo
Marcos Betancourt  as Roberto
Joe Blues  as Radio voice
Fernanda Bracho  as Fernanda (drag queen)
Cielomar Cuevas  as Cristina
Michelle Deliz  as Virginia
Rosabel del Valle  as Kathy
Juan M. García  as Policeman
Modesto Lacen  as Asaltante
Kidany Lugo  as Jorge
Flavia Manes Rossi  as Jackeline Bom Bom
Karla Marcano  as Reina
Louis Martinez  as Cashier at mini-mart
Charlie Massó  as Abraham
Yadira Nazario  as Liza
Sylvia Vargas Negrón  as Roberto's wife
Brenda Plumel  as Mari
Jorge Rangel  as Charlie
Daritcia Rivera  as Paulina
Wanda Rovira  as Ada
Anthony Stuart  as Sr. beefeater
Teófilo Torres  as Antonio 
Melisa Vázquez  as Letty
Ramon Vázquez  as Bouncer
Mahya Veray  as Draga #2 - "c.c. red"

See also
Cinema of Puerto Rico
List of films set in Puerto Rico
List of Puerto Ricans in the Academy Awards

References

External links
 

2001 films
Puerto Rican films
Films set in Puerto Rico
2001 drama films